Bonnievale is a settlement in the Cape Winelands District Municipality in the Western Cape province of South Africa.

The town is 64 km southeast of Worcester, in the Breede River Valley. It was founded in 1922, and was named after the railway siding called Vale at its opening in 1902 and Bonnie Vale in 1917. Municipal status was gained in April 1953. Bonnievale is surrounded by the Langeberge and Riversonderend Mountains. Situated on the Cape Wine Route, the area caters to tourists with locally made cheese and wine, along with private game reserves and extensive hiking trails.

Gallery

References

Populated places in the Langeberg Local Municipality
Populated places established in 1922
1922 establishments in South Africa